Pennsylvania Route 18 (PA 18) is a major north–south highway in Western Pennsylvania whose southern terminus is at West Virginia Route 69 (WV 69) at the state line in Greene County near the village of Garrison, while the northern terminus is at PA 5 in Lake City. It also has the distinction of being the longest state route in Pennsylvania.

Route description

Greene County
At this point, Route 18 leaves the concurrency and turns northwest, traveling  to the county line, following along Browns Creek, and passing through the villages of Rees Mill, Sycamore, and Nineveh.

Washington County
Next, the route meets PA Route 221, and the two overlap for just over a mile, heading northwest through the village of Prosperity. After the village, Route 18 leaves the concurrency and heads northward through the villages of Van Buren, Lagonda, and Gabby Heights as it approaches the city of Washington nearly  later. In Washington, Route 18 briefly overlaps with US 40, and the routes head west, intersect with the western terminus of PA Route 136, and then turn northwest. US 40 then leaves the concurrency, and nearly a mile later, Route 18 interchanges with I-70, connecting via city streets to the entrance and exit ramps. Before departing the city,  later, the route intersects with the eastern terminus of PA Route 844, turns northward, and passes through the village of Oak Grove. Route 18 passes through the village of Gretna  later and then overlaps with PA Route 50 for  a couple miles west of the village of Hickory before continuing north-northwest. The route then passes by the village of Atlasburg and through the village of Slovan before reaching the borough of Burgettstown  later.

Beaver County

The route enters the borough of Frankfort Springs as it enters Beaver County, and meets the southern terminus of PA Route 168 at the north end of the borough. The route then junctions with PA Route 151 at the village of Mechanicsburg about  later, and then passes through the village of McCleary. The route enters the borough, turns north-northwest, crosses the Ohio River on the Rochester-Monaca Bridge, and enters the borough of Rochester. In Rochester, Route 18 intersects with the PA Route 51/PA Route 65 overlap, and then PA Route 68 before turning northwest, west, then north-northwest. It then merges with PA Route 65 along the east bank of the Beaver River. The concurrency enters the borough of New Brighton, where Route 18 then leaves the concurrency over  later, crosses the Beaver River, enters the city of Beaver Falls, and continues northward almost . Route 18 briefly joins with PA Route 588, and then intersects with the southern terminus of PA Route 551  later, just before leaving the city and entering the borough of Big Beaver. The route then passes through the borough of Homewood about  later, and re-enters Big Beaver, where it interchanges with I-76 and The Pennsylvania Turnpike. Route 18 then passes through the borough of Koppel nearly  later, where it intersects with PA Route 351, and then re-enters Big Beaver a third time before leaving Beaver County  later.

Lawrence County
As the route enters Lawrence County, it also enters the borough of New Beaver. Route 18 then turns northwestward, and passes through the borough of Wampum  later, where it intersects with the western terminus of PA Route 288. The route re-enters New Beaver, then turns northward before its second intersection with PA Route 168 over  later, near the village of Moravia. Route 18 enters the city of New Castle nearly  later as it crosses the Mahoning River, and then meets PA Route 108. The two join and turn east, then northeast through the village of Mahoningtown, situated between the Mahoning and Shenango rivers. The concurrency then passes under US 422 about  later before turning eastward and crossing the Shenango River. Routes 108 and 168 then leave the concurrency, and Route 18 continues northward. Business US 422 then leaves westward and Route 18 continues northward out of the city. From here, PA 18 heads into a rural area of northern Lawrence County that is home to an Amish community.

Mercer County
Upon entering Mercer County, the route winds northwesterly a few miles before turning west, where it has its second interchange with I-376  later. Route 18 then turns northwesterly again, intersecting with the northern terminus of PA Route 551  later, and enters the borough of West Middlesex a mile after that. Here, the route intersects with PA Route 318. Turning northward, the route then passes under I-80 and has an interchange with PA Route 760 immediately after (Route 18 traffic interchanges with I-80 via this PA Route 760 interchange). Route 18 then enters the city of Hermitage, intersects with the southern terminus of PA Route 518 a mile north of PA Route 760 at the village of Bobby's Corners, and continues about  before intersecting with US 62 and then Business US 62 less than  later. Over  after that, the route intersects with the northern terminus of PA Route 518 at the village of Lamont's Corners east of the borough of Sharpsville before leaving Hermitage. The route enters the borough of Clark about  later, where it intersects with the northern terminus of PA Route 258. In Greenville, Route 18 intersects with the northern terminus of PA Route 846 just before its junction with PA Route 358. Here, the two routes overlap, heading eastward, and cross the Shenango River once again, before intersecting about  later with PA Route 58, which joins the concurrency for about a quarter mile. Routes 18 and 58 then leave Route 358 and head northward. Less than a half mile later, Route 18 leaves the concurrency, turning northeastward, then northward, leaving Greenville. The Route continues through rural northern Mercer County about  before passing through the village of Osgood, and leaves Mercer County less than a mile later.

Crawford County
Route 285 leaves the concurrency one block later, and the remaining routes continue eastward out of the borough, nearly a mile later, where Route 18 then leaves the concurrency and heads northward. About  later, the route is joined by PA Route 198, and the concurrency enters the borough of Conneautville.

Erie County
A mile later, the route passes through the borough of Cranesville, and then enters the borough of Platea about  later, where it interchanges with I-90. Upon exiting Girard, the route enters the borough of Lake City, where it terminates at PA Route 5 near the shore of Lake Erie.

History

1927 The route was signed from Beaver Falls to Erie
1928 Extended south from Beaver Falls to the West Virginia state line; also moved to its current alignment between PA 158 and Greenville from its previous alignment on current-day PA 158 near New Wilmington to Mercer and PA 58 from Mercer to Greenville.
1963 Moved from Liberty St., Atlantic Ave., and Washington St. in New Castle to its current alignment on Mahoning Ave. and Jefferson St.
1970 Widened from PA 518 in Hermitage (north end near Sharpsville) to Clark, and median installed; also, designation moved to the Beaver Valley Expressway (now Interstate 376 and PA 760) expressway between the West Middlesex interchange and the end of the Beaver Valley Expressway
1971 Widened and median installed from US 62 north to Highland Rd. in Hermitage (then Hickory Township)
1972 Widening completed from Clark to Shenango (village, near Greenville)
1978 Designation moved back to current alignment from the Beaver Valley Expressway designation of 1970; Business PA 18 designation through West Middlesex was eliminated
1997 Widened to 5 lanes from the north Beaver Valley Expressway interchange near West Middlesex to US 62 in Hermitage
2002 Widening completed from US 62 in Hermitage to PA 518 near Sharpsville
2008 Rerouted away from Geneva College in Beaver Falls to make the campus more safe for students.
2016 Rerouted in Potter Township for both infrastructure improvements and widening in response to the Pennsylvania Shell ethylene cracker plant, with Royal Dutch Shell paying for the realignment.

Major intersections

Special routes

PA 18 Truck (Washington)

Pennsylvania Route 18 Truck is a truck route of PA 18 that is located near Washington, Pennsylvania.

The westbound exits and entrances of I-70 lead to a narrow street (called East Wylie Avenue) connecting to PA 18, thus making it harder for trucks to access PA 18.  So, it follows I-70 west.  It exits at exit 16, following Sheffield Street.  Then, it creates a U-Turn back onto I-70 east and exits off PA 18.

PA 18 Truck (New Castle)

Pennsylvania Route 18 Truck was a truck route around a weight-restricted bridge over the Shenango River that existed from 2013 to about 2018. The bridge along Mahoning Avenue was prohibited to trucks over 30 tons, necessitating the route.  The route followed PA 108, I-376, US 422, and PA 168. In 2018, the bridge underwent rehabilitation, including the replacement of bearings, and substructure and steel repairs, among other fixes. As a result, the route was deleted upon reconstruction.

PA 18 Business (West Middlesex)

Pennsylvania Route 18 Business was a business route of PA 18 that was established in 1970 when PA 18 was shifted onto the a part of the Beaver Valley Expressway from Exit 2 (PA 18) to the PA 760/PA 18 interchange near West Middlesex, Pennsylvania.  PA 18 Business followed New Castle Road and Sharon Road through the town of West Middlesex.  The route was removed in 1978 when mainline PA 18 was rerouted on its old alignment, removing the need for the business route.

See also

References

External links

Pennsylvania Highways: PA 18
PA State Route 18 Ends

018
Transportation in Beaver County, Pennsylvania
Transportation in Crawford County, Pennsylvania
Transportation in Erie County, Pennsylvania
Transportation in Greene County, Pennsylvania
Transportation in Lawrence County, Pennsylvania
Transportation in Mercer County, Pennsylvania
Transportation in Washington County, Pennsylvania